Iain Wallace Harvie (born 19 May 1962 in Glasgow, Scotland) is the guitarist with the Scottish rock band Del Amitri.  Along with lead singer and bassist Justin Currie, Harvie is one of only two members to be present throughout Del Amitri's history since its 1982 inception. He is also the co-writer, with Currie, of many of the group's songs.

Harvie now works as a record producer on albums with both Eileen Rose and The Maccabees.  In 2000, Harvie was married and in September 2001, he and his wife Madeleine had a boy, Louis.

References

1962 births
Living people
Scottish rock guitarists
Scottish male guitarists
Musicians from Glasgow
Del Amitri members